Santa Catarina (Portuguese for Saint Catherine) is a village on the western coast of São Tomé Island in São Tomé and Príncipe. Its population is 1,862 (2012 census). It lies 13 km southwest of Neves.

Population history

References

Populated places in Lembá District
Populated coastal places in São Tomé and Príncipe